This is a list of people granted political asylum for individual and publicly known reasons. They were persecuted because of their actions as individuals, not because they were members of a persecuted group. Individual reasons for persecution can be found in the notes column of the table.

People granted asylum

See also 
 List of people who took refuge in a diplomatic mission
 American fugitives in Cuba

References

Notes

Right of asylum
Asylum